David Baruch Berman, RGD, CGD, FGDC, CPWA is a Canadian communication designer, universal design expert, and author who has worked on codes of ethics and standards for designers. He studied at the University of Waterloo from 1975 to 1980.

Selected publications
Do Good Design with foreword by Erik Spiekermann, AIGA Press/Pearson/Peachpit/New Riders (book, 2009).

See also
 List of University of Waterloo people

References

Carleton University alumni
Living people
Canadian graphic designers
1962 births
Writers from Ottawa
Canadian non-fiction writers